Ernie Fields Jr. is a baritone saxophonist and session musician.

Son of notable musician Ernie Fields, he has worked with blues, soul and funk artists including B. B. King, Bobby Bland, Stevie Wonder, Aretha Franklin, Rick James, and Marvin Gaye.

He graduated from Booker T. Washington High School in 1951 and then attended Howard University, playing with his father's band during breaks. In the 1990s he began touring with trombonist Fred Wesley, playing bagpipes as well as saxophone.

He wrote the score for the 1978 film Disco Godfather.

On April 6, 2010 episode of American Idol, Fields played the didgeridoo during Crystal Bowersox's performance of the Lennon and McCartney composition "Come Together".

Ernie Fields Jr. is music contractor for American Idol, The Voice, and X Factor.

Discography 
 1978: Here, My Dear – Marvin Gaye
 1978: Ride a Wild Horse - Motown Special Disco Version Single – Ernie Fields Jr.
 1979: Wild and Peaceful – Teena Marie
 1995: Conversation Peace – Stevie Wonder
 2008: One Kind Favor – B. B. King

Selected filmography

References 

American jazz baritone saxophonists
Living people
21st-century saxophonists
Year of birth missing (living people)